Alejandra Hoyos (born 17 February 1964) is a Colombian sports shooter. She competed in the women's 10 metre air rifle event at the 1984 Summer Olympics.

References

1964 births
Living people
Colombian female sport shooters
Olympic shooters of Colombia
Shooters at the 1984 Summer Olympics
Place of birth missing (living people)
Pan American Games medalists in shooting
Pan American Games bronze medalists for Colombia
Shooters at the 1983 Pan American Games
Medalists at the 1983 Pan American Games
20th-century Colombian women
21st-century Colombian women